Naunihal is a 1967 Indian Hindi-language drama film directed by Raj Marbros starring Sanjeev Kumar, Balraj Sahni and Indrani Mukherjee in lead roles. The film's music was composed by Madan Mohan, with lyrics by Kaifi Azmi, including the song "Meri Aawaz Suno Pyar ka Raaz Suno" (Hear my voice, hear the secret of love) sung by Mohammad Rafi. The song is picturized over the funeral procession of Prime Minister of India, Jawahar Lal Nehru.

Plot
The film is about  orphan, Raju, who is adopted by the Principal of New Era High School in Panchgani. Later, when the growing child discovers he has no relatives, he is consoled by saying, he has a relative in Chacha Nehru, that is Jawaharlal Nehru, the Prime Minister of India, thus begins his relationship with Nehru.

Cast
 Sanjeev Kumar as Rakesh
 Balraj Sahni as Principal
 Indrani Mukherjee as Uma
 Harindranath Chattopadhyay as Deranged male in Bombay
 Jagdeep as  Kavi
 Asit Sen as School-teacher
 Madhavi as Kavita
 Master Babloo as Raju/Bhikhu
 Brahm Bhardwaj as Rakesh's dad
 Abhi Bhattacharya as Kind-hearted Delhi resident
 Gopal Raj Bhutani 
 Laxmi Chhaya as Dancer / Singer
 Manmohan as Ustad Mansharam
 Mehmood Junior as Biloo

Soundtrack
The soundtrack of the film was composed by Madan Mohan with lyrics by Kaifi Azmi.
 "Meri Aawaz Suno Pyar ka Raaz Suno" - Mohammad Rafi
 "Tumhari Zulf Ke Saye Me Shaam Kar Lunga " -  Mohammad Rafi
 "Patthar Ke Bhagwaan Pighal Ja Aaj Pighalanaa Hoga" - Lata Mangeshkar
 "Ha Ha Ha Ha Chhutti Aa Gayi" - Kamal Barot, Krishna Kalle
 "Na Re Na Re Babu, Na Re Na Re Baba" - Usha Mangeshkar, Lata Mangeshkar
"Gore Galon Ki Bhi Le Lo" - Usha Mangeshkar, Asha Bhosle 
 "Rin Rin Tin Tin, Kitna Pyara Pyara Mausam Kitna Pyaara Din" - Krishna Kalle
 "Roop Ke Pujaariyo, Husn Ke Bhikaariyon" -  Usha Mangeshkar, Lata Mangeshkar

References

External links
 

Indian children's films
1967 films
Films about orphans
Films scored by Madan Mohan
1960s Hindi-language films
Cultural depictions of Jawaharlal Nehru